This is a list of diplomatic missions in Honduras, which is a republic located in Central America.  The capital, Tegucigalpa, hosts 26 embassies.

The Ministry of Foreign Affairs of Honduras does not provide a listing of consulates General or honorary consulates located in the country nor of which countries accredit ambassadors from other countries.

Embassies
Tegucigalpa

Offices
 (Embassy office)
 (Swiss Cooperation Office)

Gallery of embassies

Consulates General

In Choluteca

In San Pedro Sula

Non-resident embassies accredited to Honduras

Resident in Havana, Cuba:

 
 
 
 
 
 
 
 
 

Resident in Guatemala City, Guatemala:

 

 
 

 
 
 

Resident in Managua, Nicaragua
 
 
 

Resident in Mexico City, Mexico:

 
 

 
 

 
 

 
  
 
  
 
 
 

 
 
 
 

Resident in New York City, United States of America

 
 
 

 
 
 
  
 
 
 
 
 

Resident in Panama City, Panama:

 

 

Resident in Washington, D.C., United States of America:

 
 
 
 
 
 

Resident in other cities:

 (San José)
 (Ottawa)
 (San Salvador)
 (Singapore)

See also
 Foreign relations of Honduras

Notes

References

External links
Tegucigalpa Diplomatic List

Diplomatic missions
Honduras